Talaingod, officially the Municipality of Talaingod, is a 2nd class municipality in the province of Davao del Norte, Philippines. According to the 2020 census, it has a population of 28,333 people.

The town was created by virtue of Republic Act No. 7081 on July 29, 1991. The municipality is formerly the part of Kapalong.

Geography

Climate

Barangays

Talaingod is politically subdivided into 3 barangays.

 Dagohoy
 Palma Gil
 Santo Niño

Demographics

Economy

References

External links
 Talaingod Profile at the DTI Cities and Municipalities Competitive Index
 [ Philippine Standard Geographic Code]
 Philippine Census Information
 Local Governance Performance Management System

Municipalities of Davao del Norte
States and territories established in 1991